David Blatner is a writer and speaker specializing in desktop publishing software, such as Adobe InDesign, Adobe Photoshop, and QuarkXPress. Blatner has written 15 books about various subjects with over a half-million books in print, including Spectrums, The Joy of Pi, The Flying Book, Judaism For Dummies, and Silicon Mirage: The Art and Science of Virtual Reality. 

He also wrote a book on QuarkXPress in the 1990s, The QuarkXPress Book (winner of the 1991 Benjamin Franklin award for technical writing; later titled Real World QuarkXPress,) but later changed to Adobe InDesign, about which he has now written or co-written several books (including Real World InDesign). A cofounder of the InDesignSecrets Web site and InDesign Magazine, and cohosts a podcast by the same name. Blatner also co-hosts CreativePro Week, a week-long set of conferences for creative professionals.

He lives outside Seattle, Washington, with his wife, Debbie Carlson, and two sons.

Early life
Blatner was born in Palo Alto and attended Palo Alto High School. His father is American psychiatric pioneer Adam Blatner and his mother is Barbara Blatner-Fikes. His step-father is Richard Fikes. In the late 1980s, Blatner was a member of the Palo Alto theatrical improvisation troupe Creative Mayhem, which had also included director Kirk Wise and alternative comedy performer Jimmy Gunn. Blatner graduated from Pomona College.

Selected non-computer books
Blatner, David. Spectrums: Our Mind-boggling Universe from Infinitesimal to Infinity. New York: Walker & Company, 2012.  (hardcover)
Blatner, David. The Flying Book: Everything You've Ever Wondered about Flying on Airplanes. New York: Walker & Company, 2004.  (paperback)  (hardcover)
Blatner, David and Ted Falcon. Judaism for Dummies. New York: Hungry Minds, 2001.  (paperback)
Blatner, David. The Joy of Pi. New York: Walker & Company, 1997.  (paperback)  (hardcover)

References 

American technology writers
Living people
1966 births
Palo Alto High School alumni
Pomona College alumni